Little York is a hamlet in Cortland County, New York, United States. Little York has a post office with ZIP code 13087, which opened on April 11, 1836.

References

Hamlets in Cortland County, New York
Hamlets in New York (state)